Sumuhu'ali Yanuf I. was a Sabaean, ruler (Mukarrib) of the ancient South Arabian kingdom of Saba. Walter W. 
Müller (ed.) / Hermann von Wissmann: History of Saba' II. The great empire of the Sabaeans until its end in the early 4th century BC. (Austrian Academy of Sciences, Philosophical-Historical Class., Session Reports, Volume 402) Publishing House of the Austrian Academy of Sciences Vienna, 1982  (to Sumuhu'ali Yanuf II: pp. 219-224)  He was son of the powerful ruler Yada'il Dharih and is known from inscriptions.

Hermann von Wissmann gives his reign around 660 BC. while Kenneth A. Kitchen says around 470–455 BC. 

Sumuhu'ali Yanuf's successor can not be determined with certainty, though he may have been succeeded by one of his brothers, Yatha' Amar Watar III.

References 

Date of death unknown
Mukaribs of Saba
Date of birth unknown
Sabaeans
Kings of Saba
5th century BC Yemeni People